Washington Roberto Calcaterra, Chueco, (born 1950) is a Uruguayan retired footballer who played as a forward for club sides in Uruguay and Greece.

Club career
Born in Montevideo, Calcaterra began playing football with Cañada Nieto side Libertad Fútbol Club. He started playing with the club's senior side at age 14, but would move to Club Nacional de Football in 1970. Calcaterra was a member of Nacional's world champion side in 1971 and stayed with the club until 1974, when he went on a six-month loan to C.A. Cerro.

Calcaterra moved to Greece in July 1974, joining Greek first division side Ethnikos Piraeus F.C. He would become the joint top goal-scorer during his first season, notching 20 goals. He suffered a serious injury early in his second season with Ethnikos Piraeus, playing sparingly over the next three seasons.

After one season away from Ethnikos Piraeus, he returned for the 1979–80 season, playing in seven matches before retiring.

References

1950 births
Living people
Uruguayan footballers
Super League Greece players
Club Nacional de Football players
C.A. Cerro players
Ethnikos Piraeus F.C. players
Uruguayan expatriate footballers
Expatriate footballers in Greece
Association football forwards